The McKamie Farmhouse was a farmhouse located in Waxhaws, North Carolina, and is one of two disputed birthplaces of Andrew Jackson, the other being in South Carolina.

Sources

Andrew Jackson
Houses in Union County, North Carolina